Fred Hagist (born April 14, 1932, in Berkeley, California) was an American tennis player in the 1950s who made it to the draw of several US Championships, including 1952 where he lost in the third round.

At the 1952 Tri-State Tennis Tournament, Hagist upset top-seeded and NCAA singles champion Hugh Stewart to reach the singles final against Noel Brown. In that best-of-five-sets final, Hagist lost the first set, won the second and was down 0–2 in the third set when he strained a muscle on his right side. A doctor aided him in the locker room, but Hagist was forced to retire. To this day, he is the only male player ever to retire in a singles final in Cincinnati's century-old tournament.

Hagist played collegiate tennis at the University of California from 1951 to 1953.

References

American male tennis players
California Golden Bears men's tennis players
Sportspeople from Berkeley, California
Tennis people from California
1932 births
Living people